United Presbyterian may refer to:

United Presbyterian Church of North America
United Presbyterian Church of Scotland
United Presbyterian Church in the United States of America